The 1926 Dartmouth Indians football team was an American football team that represented Dartmouth College as an independent during the 1926 college football season. In their fourth season under head coach Jesse Hawley, the Indians compiled a 4–4 record. Newman Horton was the team captain.

Myles Lane was the team's leading scorer, with 80 points, from 13 touchdowns and two kicked extra points.

Dartmouth played its home games at Memorial Field on the college campus in Hanover, New Hampshire.

Schedule

References

Dartmouth
Dartmouth Big Green football seasons
Dartmouth Indians football